Yemisi Edun is the managing director/chief executive officer of First City Monument Bank, the first woman to ever hold the position. She assumed this position in July 2021 after the suspension of Adam Nuhu. 


Education
Yemisi Edun graduated with a bachelor's degree in chemistry from the University of Ife. She proceeded to the University of Liverpool, where she graduated with a master's degree in international accounting and finance Until her appointment as managing director, she was the chief financial officer of the bank and the acting chief executive officer. Edun is a fellow of the Institute of Chartered Accountants of Nigeria and a CFA holder. She is also an associate member of the of Chartered Institute of Stock brokers, an Associate Member of the Chartered Institute of Taxation of Nigeria, and a member of the Information Systems Audit and Control.

References

External links

Living people
Nigerian women business executives
Year of birth missing (living people)
Obafemi Awolowo University alumni
Alumni of the University of Liverpool
CFA charterholders